The Scamp is a 1957 British drama film directed by Wolf Rilla and starring Richard Attenborough, Terence Morgan, Colin Petersen, and Dorothy Alison. It was based on the play, "Uncertain Joy," by Charlotte Hastings.

It was released in the U.S. as Strange Affection.

Synopsis
A schoolteacher and his wife take in the tempestuous child of an abusive drifter. When the father returns their lives become complicated by issues of corporal punishment, physical abuse, strained relations and various crimes.

Cast
 Richard Attenborough as Stephen Leigh  
 Dorothy Alison as Barbara Leigh  
 Colin Petersen as Tod Dawson  
 Terence Morgan as Mike Dawson  
 Jill Adams as Julie Dawson  
 Maureen Delany as Mrs. Perryman  
 Margaretta Scott as Mrs. Blundell  
 David Franks as Eddie  
 Geoffrey Keen as Headmaster  
 Charles Lloyd-Pack as Beamish  
 June Cunningham as Annette  
 Sam Kydd as Shopkeeper
 Victor Brooks as Inspector Birch

Critical reception
TV Guide wrote, "Shaky direction and a cliche-ridden script mar any possibilities for this human interest story"; whereas Leonard Maltin called it a "Decent British drama."

Box office
According to Kinematograph Weekly the film was "in the money" at the British box office in 1957.

References

External links

1957 films
1957 drama films
Films directed by Wolf Rilla
British drama films
Films shot at British National Studios
1950s English-language films
1950s British films